Nam Naadu ( Our Country) is a 2007 Indian Tamil language political action film starring Sarath Kumar and Karthika Mathew. It is a remake of 2006 Malayalam film Lion.The film received negative reviews and failed to replicate the success of the original.

Plot
Aalavandhar a corrupt politician who holds the post as Education minister and wants to become the chief minister. He is supported by his sons-in-law, Sathya  ex-IPS Officer who runs a finance company and Elamaran  IAS officer, the district collector. With the idea of his in-laws, Aalavandhar tries to disturb peace in state and make situation against the CM.

Muthazhagu  an honest youth wing leader of the same ruling party learns and opposes the move of his father and he stands by and for the people. Sathya, Elamaran and Aalavandhar allocates a land space in a village for a cool drink company. The village is rich in land water and the people oppose for the governments move against them. But these corrupt personalities issue an order for the start of the factory. Muthazhagu tries to meet the collector  with the people of the locality and fails to get a reason for it. So he moves on to the court and with the court's order he gets a stay for the project.

In order to save and work for the people he plans to contest in the elections as an independent candidate. He stands opposite his father Aalavandhar. He wins the elections and extends his support to the party and gets a place in the ministry. He takes charge of the high-profile department as Home Minister.

Muthazhagu commands and passes orders to all the departments to work for the welfare of the public and he would take care of all the other issues within the departments. He threatens the CM and takes orders for effective governance.

Aalavandhar gets irritated by the moves of Muthazhagu and discusses the same with his in-laws. Sathya plans to wipe him off. This brings Aalavandhar to realize his misdoings in the past and meets Muthazhagu and confesses his mistake and asks him to return to their home. Muthazhagu accepts to return to their home along with his wife Gowri. On an official call he goes to Delhi. Aalavandhar meets up in an accident and passes away. Muthazagu's mom thinks Muthazagu killed his dad and bans him from the house. Muthazaghu finds that Sathya was the mastermind for the murder as his dad  said to him about the public confession of their crimes. Muthazaghu kills his brother-in-law in the climax.

Cast

 Sarath Kumar as Muthazhagu
 Karthika as Gowri
 Nassar as Aaalavandhar
 Ramesh Khanna as Narayanan
 Charan Raj as Sathya
 Ponvannan as Elamaran
 Vijayakumar as Boominathan
 Manivannan as Purushothaman
 Santhana Bharathi as political member
 C. R. Saraswathi as political member
 Nellai Siva as political member
 Pragathi as Muthazhagu's mother
 Abitha as Sathya's wife
 Sriman as Bala
 Riyaz Khan as Krishna Kumar I.P.S
 Madhan Bob as Sena
 Ilavarasu as Albert
 Pandu as political member
 Raj Kapoor as local rowdy
 Besant Ravi as local rowdy
 T. P. Gajendran as Irulandi
 Scissor Manohar

Soundtrack
Lyrics were written by Kabilan.
"Kadhal Ennum" - Murali Yesudas, Sujatha
"Kottaisamy Varaaru" - Manikka Vinayagam
"Manasil Manasil" - Karthik, Chinmayee
"Vaazhaiyadi" - Jerome Pushparaj

Critical reception
Sify wrote:"Sarath and director Suresh has kept the theme of politics as family business, and added a lot of heroism to the central character and made him a one-man fighting machine". Kollywood Today wrote:"As a whole, taking the whole film into consideration, Nam Naadu is a film for a political cause and also a commercial film that can be watched to kill the time and not more than that".

References

External links 
 

Tamil remakes of Malayalam films
2007 films
2000s Tamil-language films
Indian political films
Fictional portrayals of the Tamil Nadu Police
Films scored by Srikanth Deva